The 2019–20 CAF Champions League qualifying rounds were played from 9 August to 24 October 2019. A total of 61 teams competed in the qualifying rounds to decide the 16 places in the group stage of the 2019–20 CAF Champions League.

Draw

The draw for the qualifying rounds was held on 21 July 2019 at the CAF headquarters in Cairo, Egypt.

The entry round of the 61 teams entered into the draw was determined by their performances in the CAF competitions for the previous five seasons (CAF 5-Year Ranking points shown in parentheses).

Format

In the qualifying rounds, each tie was played on a home-and-away two-legged basis. If the aggregate score was tied after the second leg, the away goals rule was applied, and if still tied, extra time was not played, and the penalty shoot-out was used to determine the winner (Regulations III. 13 & 14).

Schedule
The schedule of the competition was as follows.

Bracket
The bracket of the draw was announced by the CAF on 21 July 2019.

The 16 winners of the first round advanced to the group stage, while the 16 losers of the first round entered the Confederation Cup play-off round.

Preliminary round
The preliminary round included the 58 teams that did not receive byes to the first round.

Raja Casablanca won 7–3 on aggregate.

Al-Nasr won 3–2 on aggregate.

3–3 on aggregate. JS Kabylie won on away goals.

Horoya won 2–1 on aggregate.

ASC Kara won 2–1 on aggregate.

AS Vita Club won 1–0 on aggregate.

1–1 on aggregate. Al-Hilal won on away goals.

Enyimba won 5–1 on aggregate.

USM Alger won 5–2 on aggregate.

Gor Mahia won 5–1 on aggregate.

Al-Ahly won 13–0 on aggregate.

Cano Sport won 3–2 on aggregate.

Zamalek won 13–0 on aggregate.

Génération Foot won 3–1 on aggregate.

Étoile du Sahel won 8–3 on aggregate.

Asante Kotoko won 4–3 on aggregate.

KCCA won 4–3 on aggregate.

Petro de Luanda won 4–0 on aggregate.

3–3 on aggregate. Côte d'Or won on away goals.

Mamelodi Sundowns won 5–2 on aggregate.

FC Nouadhibou won 1–0 on aggregate.

Elect-Sport won 2–0 on aggregate.

ZESCO United won 3–0 on aggregate.

Young Africans won 2–1 on aggregate.

FC Platinum won 3–2 on aggregate.

1–1 on aggregate. UD Songo won on away goals.

1º de Agosto won 4–0 on aggregate.

Green Eagles won 2–1 on aggregate.

Fosa Juniors won 2–1 on aggregate.

First round
The first round, also called the second preliminary round, included 32 teams: the 3 teams that received byes to this round, and the 29 winners of the preliminary round.

Raja Casablanca won 4–2 on aggregate.

2–2 on aggregate. JS Kabylie won 5–4 on penalties.

AS Vita Club won 1–0 on aggregate.

Al-Hilal won 1–0 on aggregate.

USM Alger won 6–1 on aggregate.

Al-Ahly won 6–0 on aggregate.

2–2 on aggregate. Zamalek won on away goals.

Étoile du Sahel won 3–2 on aggregate.

1–1 on aggregate. Petro de Luanda won on away goals.

Mamelodi Sundowns won 16–1 on aggregate.

Wydad AC won 6–1 on aggregate.

Espérance de Tunis won 3–2 on aggregate.

ZESCO United won 3–2 on aggregate.

FC Platinum won 5–2 on aggregate.

2–2 on aggregate. 1º de Agosto won on away goals.

TP Mazembe won 3–1 on aggregate.

Notes

References

External links
Total CAF Champions League, CAFonline.com
CAF Total Champions League 2019/20

1
August 2019 sports events in Africa
September 2019 sports events in Africa
October 2019 sports events in Africa